The Brasilia Brazil Temple is a temple of the Church of Jesus Christ of Latter-day Saints under construction in Brasilia, Brazil.

History 
The intent to construct the temple was announced by church president Thomas S. Monson on April 2, 2017.  The Brasilia Brazil Temple was announced concurrently with 4 other temples. At the time, the number of the church's total number of operating or announced temples was 182 with this announcement. 

On September 26, 2020, a groundbreaking to signify beginning of construction was held, with Adilson de Paula Parrella, president of the church's Brazil Area, presiding.

See also 

 The Church of Jesus Christ of Latter-day Saints in Brazil
 Comparison of temples of The Church of Jesus Christ of Latter-day Saints
 List of temples of The Church of Jesus Christ of Latter-day Saints
 List of temples of The Church of Jesus Christ of Latter-day Saints by geographic region
 Temple architecture (Latter-day Saints)

References

External links 
 Church Newsroom of The Church of Jesus Christ of Latter-day Saints
 Brasilia Brazil Temple at ChurchofJesusChristTemples.org

Temples (LDS Church) in Brazil
Proposed religious buildings and structures of the Church of Jesus Christ of Latter-day Saints
Buildings and structures in Brasília
21st-century Latter Day Saint temples
Proposed buildings and structures in Brazil